Neelakantaru Pandarathil. N ( 1912–2007) was an Indian politician and freedom fighter. He represented Nedumangad constituency in the first and second Kerala legislative assemblies. He was a member of Democratic Congress and got elected into the Travancore Cochin Assembly in the 1950 bye-election. He later joined the communist party and  participated in the freedom struggle. He was also associated with Travancore State Congress.

References

Kerala MLAs 1957–1959
1912 births
2007 deaths